The 1938 International cricket season was from April 1938 to August 1938.

Season overview

June

Test Trial in England

Australia in England

July

Ireland in Scotland

MCC in Netherlands

England in Netherlands

References

1938 in cricket